Blue Eyed Black Boy is the third studio album by the Israeli electronica-world fusion trio Balkan Beat Box.

Track listing

Personnel 

 Tomer Yosef - lead vocals, percussion, samples
 Ori Kaplan - saxophone
 Tamir Muskat - drums, percussion, programming

References 

Balkan Beat Box albums
2010 albums
Dub albums